Dušan Karol and Daniel Köllerer were the defending champions, but only Karol tried to defend his title.
He partnered with Jan Hájek, but they lost to Tomasz Bednarek and Mateusz Kowalczyk in the semifinals.
Polish pair won this tournament. They defeated Flavio Cipolla and Alessandro Motti 6–1, 6–1 in the final.

Seeds

Draw

Draw

References
 Doubles Draw

Open Tarragona Costa Daurada - Doubles
Open Tarragona Costa Daurada